Solatia piscatoria is a species of sea snail, a marine gastropod mollusk in the family Cancellariidae, the nutmeg snails.

Description
The length of the shell attains 20.1 mm.

Distribution
This marine species occurs off Mauretania.

References

 Hemmen, J. (2007). Recent Cancellariidae. Annotated and illustrated catalogue of Recent Cancellariidae. Privately published, Wiesbaden. 428 pp.

External links
 Gmelin J.F. (1791). Vermes. In: Gmelin J.F. (Ed.) Caroli a Linnaei Systema Naturae per Regna Tria Naturae, Ed. 13. Tome 1(6). G.E. Beer, Lipsiae
 Lamarck, (J.-B. M.) de. (1822). Histoire naturelle des animaux sans vertèbres. Tome septième. Paris: published by the Author, 711 pp.
 Jousseaume F.P. (1887). La famille Cancellariidae (Mollusques Gastéropodes). Le Naturaliste. ser. 2, 9(13): 155-157
 Pallary, P. (1920). Exploration scientifique du Maroc organisée par la Société de Géographie de Paris et continuée par la Société des Sciences Naturelles du Maroc. Deuxième fascicule. Malacologie. i>Larose, Rabat et Paris pp. 108. 1(1): map
 Crosse, H. (1861). Étude sur le genre cancellaire, suivie du catalogue des espèces vivantes et fossiles actuellement connues. Journal de Conchyliologie. 9(3): 220-256.
 Verhecken, A. (2007). Revision of the Cancellariidae (Mollusca, Neogastropoda, Cancellarioidea) of the eastern Atlantic (40°N-40°S) and the Mediterranean. Zoosystema. 29(2): 281-364.

Cancellariidae
Gastropods described in 1791